Gamesmaster is a fictional mutant character appearing in American comic books published by Marvel Comics. He first appeared in The Uncanny X-Men #283 (1991).

Fictional character biography
Gamesmaster is a mutant with the ability to have omnipathy. In his life before becoming the Gamesmaster, he led a regular life with a wife and child; however, years of omnipathic exposure to other people's minds drove him to a point where he eventually forgot his real name.

At some point, Gamesmaster was contacted by the immortal sorceress Selene and then by the Black Queen of the Hellfire Club. Together, they organized the Upstarts, a competition for wealthy and powerful individuals with the sole purpose of killing mutants for points in a twisted game. He agreed only to provide a distraction from the constant chatter in his mind. By focusing on the ambitious and powerful thoughts of the Upstarts, Gamesmaster was able to drown out the rest of the world.

In his capacity as the referee of the Upstarts' games, Gamesmaster oversaw the Upstarts' activities, which included confrontations with the team of adolescent mutants known as the Hellions and the team of superhuman mutant adventurers known as the X-Men. After Selene was removed from the game by the Upstart Trevor Fitzroy, Gamesmaster continued to monitor the competition.

After the Upstarts captured several former young members of the mutant trainee team, the New Mutants, and took them to Gamesmaster's base in the Swiss Alps, their teammates in X-Force and the New Warriors attempted to rescue them. Gamesmaster would have defeated them if it were not for the intervention of Paige Guthrie, the mutant sister of X-Force's Cannonball, who argued that a greater game would be to compete with Professor X, the telepathic founder of the X-Men, and others like him who hoped to find and guide the next generation of mutants. Gamesmaster agreed and disbanded the Upstarts after allowing the heroes to leave.

Later, Gamesmaster captured both Doctor Weisman of the Weisman Institute for the Criminally Insane and one of the patients, a young boy named Jeremy Stevens. The Institute had a history of involvement with Xavier, who sensed something was amiss and sent Siryn, the mutant daughter of former X-Man Banshee, to investigate. On arrival, Gamesmaster clouded Siryn's memories, but she was rescued by her ally, the mercenary known as Deadpool. Unbeknownst to Siryn, Deadpool had been captured, but she eventually became aware of his predicament and, with the help of her X-Force teammate Shatterstar, came to his rescue.

Gamesmaster later forced Shatterstar to return to the institute. Shatterstar's life had become intertwined with that of one of the institute's patients, Benjamin Russell, and Shatterstar merged with the body of Russell to live. As all of this occurred under the watchful eye of Gamesmaster, the full implications of these events are yet to be revealed.

Soon after, Gamesmaster attempted to control the minds of members of the X-Men by trapping them in a world of his own design to hide the fact that he had kidnapped the telepathic Jean Grey. However, the X-Men learned of Gamesmaster's deception and confronted him. Gamesmaster subsequently revealed that it was part of a game he was playing with the X-Men to see how they would react to their perfect world, where mutants were no longer feared. He took Grey prisoner, as she was the only telepath among the X-Men who could challenge him. However, Gamesmaster had underestimated the X-Man Joseph, who was unknowingly a clone of the self-styled master of magnetism, Magneto. This error allowed Grey to break free and defeat Gamesmaster.

Years later, Gamesmaster resurfaced, still in possession of his mutant powers following the events of M-Day. He showed a strong interest in the mutant X-23 and promised to watch her closely, even against her will.

Powers and abilities
The Games Master is an omnipath, a superhuman telepath able to hear the thoughts of every being on the planet. However, he cannot block the thoughts out, and thus his mind is constantly filled with seven billion voices, unless he is able to intensely concentrate on a distraction. Gamesmaster also possesses the ability to manipulate the thoughts of others and has suggested that, in addition to controlling minds en masse (as he once did with Salem Center in New York), he can manipulate the thoughts of the entire population of Earth simultaneously (though Jean Grey determined this to be a fallacy while in combat with him).

To a lesser extent, Gamesmaster is also able to control the actions of other sentient beings. He was also shown to be capable of keeping other superhuman abilities in check, as he once did with the X-Man Rogue. So far, only three people have proven to be immune to his powers: Jean Grey, Husk (although Husk was only able to resist his telepathy by "husking" into a certain form), and Speedball.

References

Comics characters introduced in 1991
Marvel Comics mutants
Marvel Comics supervillains
Marvel Comics telepaths